A reduction formula is used to represent some expression in a simpler form. 

It may refer to:

Mathematics 

Formulas of reduction, the decomposition of multiple integrals
Integration by reduction formulae, expressing an integral in terms of the same integral but in lower powers

Physics 

LSZ reduction formula, a method to calculate S-matrix elements from the time-ordered correlation functions of a quantum field theory